Professor Javed Musarrat (born 1960) is the former Vice Chancellor of Baba Ghulam Shah Badshah University. and present Vice Chancellor of Integral University Lucknow.

Career 
Prof. Mussarat has served in the United States as visiting scientist, Michigan State University and visiting assistant professor, Ohio State University, Columbus. He was also the Chair Professor, DNA Research Chair, King Saud University, Riyadh.

Early life and education 
Prior to his appointment he was the Dean of Faculty of Agricultural Sciences at Aligarh Muslim University and Chairman of Department of Agricultural Microbiology.

References 

Academic staff of Aligarh Muslim University
Aligarh Muslim University alumni